The World of David the Gnome, originally titled David, el Gnomo (also known as David, the Gnome), is a Spanish animated television series based on the children's book The Secret Book of Gnomes, by the Dutch author Wil Huygen and illustrator Rien Poortvliet. The series was originally created in Spain by BRB Internacional (who were also responsible for the Dogtanian and the Three Muskehounds franchise and other cartoons such as Bobobobs and Around the World with Willy Fog) and Televisión Española, and retains a sense of the lush illustrations of the original books. Twenty-six episodes were produced. There was also a spin-off series entitled Wisdom of the Gnomes.

The English-language dub The World of David the Gnome was produced by the Canadian studio CINAR, in association with Miramax Films. Christopher Plummer narrated, with the voice of David the Gnome being provided by Tom Bosley. David the Gnome aired weekdays on Nickelodeon's Nick Jr. block from 1988 until 1995 in the U.S.

Synopsis 
The series presents the gnomes as a kind species, of 15 centimetres (6 inches) in height, and between 250 and 300 grams (8 and 10 ounces) in weight depending on gnome body mass. According to their habitat, all types of gnomes are distinguished: the ones of the forest, the ones of the garden, the ones of the farm, the ones of the house, the ones of the dunes, those of Siberia, and nomadic "gypsy" gnomes (commonly looked down upon by other gnomes). With few exceptions, a gnome's lifespan is exactly 400 years, though there is one example of a couple in the Balkans living 550 years.  On their 400th year, they transition from diminutive humanoid beings, into large immobile trees.  They appear to have some control over when and where this happens, but cannot avoid the transition altogether.  This end of the gnome lifecycle explains their devotion to protecting forests: as the trees consist of their ancestors.

Gnomes such as the main characters live in pairs in comfortable caves or holes under trees (in their case in the company of a pair of mice and a cricket). Their diet is mostly vegetarian. They are helped by the animals of the forest when travelling long distances or when they need to arrive quickly at a specific location. Gnomes work in many ways to repair the damage inevitably caused by humans. They also have the power of telepathy and mind control.

Their main enemies are the trolls, malevolent and clumsy creatures who always make trouble for the other inhabitants of the forest, as well as gnome poachers.

Those episodes are focused on all characters having problems with them.

Characters 
 David – A gnome of the forest. David is 399 years old, making him the oldest gnome around (since gnomes live no more than 400 years exactly, except Franklin, the gnome from the West, who lived 550 years), although he possesses exceptional constitution. David is a doctor, and he uses his knowledge of many fields, such as hypnosis and acupuncture, to heal his patients, usually animals, such as his faithful friend Swift the Fox, or other gnomes.  David also befriends a bird that, when he whistles, immediately arrives to quickly transport him to wherever necessary. For longer trips, he sometimes travels in a basket attached to the neck of the bird. Voiced by Tom Bosley.
 Lisa – David's wife and companion and is the same age as him. Together they have two children, Lily and Harold. David's wife is in charge of the household, although she occasionally accompanies him and helps him in his distinct adventures. Voiced by Jane Woods.
 Swift the Fox – David's best friend who lives in the forest and is always available to transport David to wherever he is required. Huygen's son, Josh, came up with this character, and was his favorite character. He is characterised by his speed and loyalty to David. Adult Swift's age is 1 and is the pup of David's former fox mount, Nimble. Voiced by Vlasta Vrána.
 The Trolls – In the series, there are four trolls who constantly try to bother the gnomes. Their names are Pit, Pat, Pot, and Holler. Holler has a receding hairline and is the only one of the four able to think. They have some supernatural powers, and are capable of using magical spells too powerful for gnome magic to break. However, in addition to their extreme lack of wit, they also have another severe weakness: direct exposure to sunlight turns them into stone. Holler was voiced by A.J. Henderson, Pit was voiced by Marc Denis, Pat was voiced by Rob Roy, while Pot was voiced by Adrian Knight.
 Susan – David and Lisa's granddaughter.  Voiced by Barbara Pogenmiller.
 King – Voiced by Richard Dumont
 Paul – David's twin brother. Not only does Paul have a normal moustache in contrast to David's handlebar moustache but his jumper is a darker shade of blue, he has a bigger nose, his gnome hat is dark blue whereas David's is coloured red, and his trousers and boots are an inverse of David's: David's trousers are brown and his boots are beige, while Paul wears beige trousers and dark boots. Voiced by Walter Massey.

Episodes 
David the Gnome ran for twenty-six episodes, each approximately 24 minutes in length. In the U.S., the series originally aired between January 4, 1988, and February 8, 1988. The English-language episode titles are listed below, along with brief episode synopses:

Telecast and home media 
The series aired on weekdays on Nickelodeon's Nick Jr. block for seven years from 1988 until 1995 in the U.S. Later, it aired on TLC (as part of the channel's Ready Set Learn block). The series aired on The Family Channel in Canada from its launch in 1988 until 1990. It was later aired on British Columbia's statewide Knowledge Network. 

In England, the series ran on various channels. It was first picked up on ITV's Children's ITV block, then The Children's Channel, and finally Nickelodeon. In Australia, the show was first picked up on ABC, and later aired on Nickelodeon.

In the 1980s, Family Home Entertainment released four VHS tapes of the series in the U.S., each containing two episodes. In the United Kingdom, Video Collection International Ltd released one VHS tape of The World of David the Gnome (Cat. No. VC1178) with the first two episodes, Good Medicine and Witch Way Out, on 14 May 1990.

A complete series DVD set was released in the United Kingdom in 2006 by Revelation Films. The complete series was also released on DVD in 2011 in Spain and Italy. Most episodes are available on DVD in Germany and the Netherlands. The Italian and Spanish-language versions can currently be found on their respective countries' Amazon websites. The complete series was released on DVD in the U.S. in 2012 by Oasis DVDs.

Sequels 

After the success of the initial series, the same producers created a spin-off called Wisdom of the Gnomes (1987). In this series, the protagonist is a gnome called Klaus, a judge who travels with his assistant Dani to solve disputes.

Other sequels, both in serial and movie form, were The Gnomes' Great Adventure (1987), The Great Adventure of the Gnomes (1995), The Gnomes in the Snow (1999) and The Fantastic Adventures of the Gnomes (2000).

The series was also preceded by the popular television movie Gnomes in 1980, which was based on the same series of books as The World of David the Gnome.

In 1997, there was a series called The New World of the Gnomes which was a retelling of the original series as David and his nephew Tomte now travel the world to save animals and preserve nature as it is endangered by problems of modern-day pollution and environmental dangers. Lisa, David's wife from the original series, also appears in the show. Other than the humans who cause either unintentional or intentional destruction to nature and harm to animals, the show's other antagonists are three trolls who run into David and the gnomes now and then, their names are Stinky, Brute, and Drool. The show was made in collaboration with the World Wildlife Foundation.

Cancelled revival 
In 2015, The Weinstein Company announced a revival titled Gnomes. No update has been given since The Weinstein Company went defunct on July 16, 2018 due to the sex abuse scandal.

References

External links 
 
 
 David the Gnome fansite

1980s animated television series
Spanish children's animated fantasy television series
Television shows based on children's books
Television series by Cookie Jar Entertainment
Television series by Miramax Television
1980s children's television series
1980s Spanish television series
1985 Spanish television series debuts
1986 Spanish television series endings
Fictional gnomes